Ahn Jae-sung (born October 12, 1988) is a South Korean male curler and curling coach.

Teams

Mixed doubles

Record as a coach of national teams

References

External links

Living people
South Korean male curlers
South Korean curling coaches
1988 births
Place of birth missing (living people)
21st-century South Korean people